T. K. Raja is an Indian politician and incumbent Member of the Legislative Assembly of Tamil Nadu. He was elected to the Tamil Nadu legislative assembly from Tiruppattur constituency as a Pattali Makkal Katchi candidate in 2001, and 2006 elections.

References 

Members of the Tamil Nadu Legislative Assembly
Tamil Nadu politicians
Living people
Year of birth missing (living people)